Sukkulovo (Hıwıqqul) is a rural locality (a selo) and the administrative centre of Sukkulovsky Selsoviet, Dyurtyulinsky District, Bashkortostan, Russia. The population was 825 as of 2010. There are 11 streets.

Geography 
Sukkulovo is located 9 km southeast of Dyurtyuli (the district's administrative centre) by road. Mamadalevo is the nearest rural locality.

References 

Rural localities in Dyurtyulinsky District